Aliabad (also Romanized as ‘Alīābād) is a village in Bagh Safa Rural District, Sarchehan District, Bavanat County, Fars Province, Iran. At the 2006 census, its population was 45, in 8 families.

References 

Populated places in Sarchehan County